On the Floor at the Boutique is a live album mixed by British big beat musician Fatboy Slim. It was recorded at the Big Beat Boutique in 1997 in Brighton, England and released in 1998.

Track listing

See also
 On the Floor at the Boutique – Volume 2
 On the Floor at the Boutique – Volume 3

References

External links 
 

1998 live albums
Fatboy Slim albums
Skint Records albums